Old Material 1984–1986 is the first compilation album by Canadian folk rock group Spirit of the West, released in November 1989 by Stony Plain Records.

It was the band's final release for Stony Plain Records. Side one of the album includes five tracks from their out-of-print 1984 album Spirit of the West, and side two presents a 1986 live performance from the Vancouver East Cultural Centre.

The live performance showcases a band already quite skilled at the crowd-pleasing sense of showmanship that would become their trademark, especially when John Mann flubs the beginning of "General Guinness" from laughing too hard at the clownish antics of bandmates J. Knutson and Geoffrey Kelly.

Track listing
All songs by Mann, Kelly and Knutson, except where otherwise noted.

"Rocks at Thieves' Bay"  – 4:53
"To a Highlander Unknown"  – 4:16
"Doin' Quite Alright"  – 4:40
"Down on the Dole"  – 5:08
"John Goodman"  – 3:48
"Aberdeen"  – 4:07
"Ships in Full Sail"  – 3:05 - music by Mann/Kelly/Knutson, lyrics by Mann's father (name currently unknown)
"Be Right"  – 5:58
"Time to Ring Some Changes"  – 4:19, written by Richard Thompson
"General Guinness"  – 3:46, traditional

Spirit of the West albums
1989 compilation albums
Stony Plain Records compilation albums